Jaffa Road is one of the longest and oldest major streets in Jerusalem. It crosses the city from east to west, from the Old City walls to downtown Jerusalem, the western portal of Jerusalem and the Jerusalem-Tel Aviv highway. It is lined with shops, businesses, and restaurants. It joins with Ben Yehuda Street and King George Street to form the Downtown Triangle central business district. Major landmarks along Jaffa Road are Tzahal Square (IDF square), Safra Square (city hall), Zion Square, Davidka Square, the triple intersection (Hameshulash) at King George V Street and Straus Street, the Ben Yehuda Street pedestrian mall, the Mahane Yehuda market, and the Jerusalem Central Bus Station. Jaffa Road has been redeveloped as a car-free pedestrian mall served by the Jerusalem Light Rail, as well as by the Jerusalem–Yitzhak Navon railway station directly adjacent to the Central Bus Station.

History 

Originally paved in 1861 as part of the highway to Jaffa, the road quickly became a focal point for the 19th century expansion out of Jerusalem's Old City walls, and early neighbourhoods like the Russian Compound, Nahalat Shiva, and Mahane Yehuda blossomed around it, as well as Shaare Zedek hospital. Proximity to the artery quickly became a measure of real-estate value in the booming city. Traffic originally consisted of camels and mules, and the route was eventually improved enough to allow for horse-drawn carriages. The German Templers, who established the German Colony, first began a regular carriage service along the road to Jaffa.

During the period of the British Mandate, the street was further developed with the establishment of many central institutions including the city hall, the city's central post office, the Anglo-Palestine Bank, and the Generali office building. The buildings on its easternmost end constructed along the Old City walls were destroyed in July 1944 so as not to obscure the city's historic view. During this period the street took on its modern shape, and it became the heart of the city's developing central business district as most commerce left the Old City. During the city's 19-year division between Israel and Jordan after the 1948 Arab-Israeli War, which separated the Old City from much of modern Jerusalem, Jaffa Road's primacy as the city-centre was unchallenged.

The Jerusalem Municipality, Jerusalem's main post office, the Mahane Yehuda Market are located on Jaffa Road. As a bustling thoroughfare, it has been targeted by terrorist groups and some of the most devastating terrorist attacks from the late 1960s onward have been carried out on this street, among them the Zion Square refrigerator bombing (1975), the Jaffa Road bus bombings (1996), the Sbarro restaurant suicide bombing (2001), and the Jaffa Street bombing (2002).

For much of its hundred-year existence, Jaffa Road has served as Jerusalem's central artery. The municipality responded to problems in the struggling city-centre through focused efforts to redevelop the street; Jaffa Road was limited to public transit (buses and taxis) in an attempt to divert traffic congestion from the area, and became  the centrepiece of a new development plan for revitalising the downtown. A tunnel was excavated under the street at Tzahal Square in 2004 to allow the city's central north-south route to bypass it. In order to accommodate the new system, new utility lines were laid under one side of the road, which was also widened. 180 properties were evacuated to allow for the road's improvement.

The Jerusalem Light Rail began operating  in 2011. At the western end of Jaffa Road, opposite the Central Bus Station, it passes over Jaffa Road  via Santiago Calatrava's Chords Bridge, which serves as an architectural beacon for the area.

Significant buildings and landmarks
East to west on historical Jaffa Road:
Jaffa Gate
Jerusalem Old Town Hall
Safra Square with the Jerusalem Municipality complex
Bank Leumi (former Anglo-Palestine Bank) main branch building, by architect Erich Mendelsohn
Central Post Office Building (Jerusalem), by architects Austen Harrison and Percy Harold Winter
Generali Building, by leading Fascist architect Marcello Piacentini
Russian Compound borders to the south on Jaffa Road
Zion Square
Mashiach Borochoff House, 1908 villa
Davidka Square
Mahane Yehuda Market
Ohel Shlomo, former courtyard neighborhood, partially demolished
Sha'arei Yerushalayim, former courtyard neighborhood (demolished)
Batei Saidoff (Saidoff Houses)
Shaare Zedek hospital (old building, 1902-1980, aka "Wallach" or "Amsterdam Hospital")
Jerusalem Central Bus Station and the adjacent Jerusalem–Yitzhak Navon railway station
Chords Bridge (2008) by architect Santiago Calatrava

Gallery

See also
 Expansion of Jerusalem in the 19th century

References

External links

 Jaffa Road history on the Jerusalem Municipality website

 
Streets in Jerusalem
Late modern history of Jerusalem
Downtown Triangle (Jerusalem)